Paul-Agricole Génin (14 February 1832, in Avignon – 22 December 1903, in Paris) was a French flautist and composer for flute. He was a student of Louis Dorus and became first flute at the Théâtre-Italien (Comédie-Italienne) Paris.

He is sometime confused with Pierre Génin, another flautist who emigrated to England.

Compositions and arrangements 
Carnaval de Venise opus 14, fantasia and variations for flute and orchestra. A reduction also exists for flute and piano.

Fantasia on Themes from Verdi's "La Traviata", for flute and harp.

Fantaisie sur "Faust" de Gounod No.1, for flute and piano.

References

Musicians from Avignon
1832 births
1903 deaths
French classical flautists